Feltscher is a surname. Notable people with the surname include:

Binia Feltscher (born 1978), Swiss curler
Frank Feltscher (born 1988), Swiss-Venezuelan footballer
Rolf Feltscher (born 1990), Swiss-Venezuelan footballer, brother of Frank